The Texas Instruments Professional Computer (abbreviated TIPC or TI PC) and the Texas Instruments Professional Portable Computer (TIPPC) are personal computers produced by Texas Instruments that were both released on January 31, 1983, and discontinued around 1985; the TIPC is a desktop PC and the TIPPC is a portable version that is fully compatible with it. Both computers were most often used by white-collar information workers and professionals that needed to gather, manipulate and transmit information.

Features and specifications
The TIPC is very similar to the IBM PC both architecturally and from a user-experience perspective, with some technically superior aspects. It is based on the Intel 8088 CPU and an optional Intel 8087 floating point coprocessor. It supports MS-DOS compatible operating systems, but is not a fully IBM PC compatible computer. Alternative operating systems are CP/M-86, Concurrent CP/M-86, and the UCSD p-System.

The TIPC was reviewed in Byte magazine in its December 1983 issue. The CPU clocked at 5 MHz (a bit faster than the 4.77 MHz of the IBM PC) and has 64 KB of RAM pre-installed. A RAM board can be installed in an expansion slot providing an additional 192 KB or RAM, for a maximum of 256 KB. A later version supports up to 768 KB of total memory. The computer featured 5 expansion slots and has either a 12-inch green-phosphor monochrome (CRT) monitor or a 12-inch color monitor with a color graphics resolution of 720x300 pixels. For text, the display shows 25 lines of 80 columns each. The device has a 5¼-inch floppy disk drive and can support a second floppy drive or a "Winchester" hard drive without requiring the use of an expansion slot or separate chassis, and typically features one of each.

Byte said the keyboard, which has a different layout for the arrow keys and is quieter than the IBM PC, was "well, wonderful". The keyboard has 57 typewriter keys, 5 cursor control keys, 12 function keys and a separate 18-key numeric keypad area. The keyboard has "infinite height adjustment from 5 to 15 degrees slope and connects to the system unit with a telephone-type coiled cord so you can position the key
board for greatest comfort (even use it in your lap)". The computer also has the capability to map the keyboard keys to characters to support arbitrary user customization of the keyboard layout. The keyboard ordinarily supports 256 distinct characters to enable international use, and the character set can be expanded to 512 characters for special-purpose applications. A light is provided to indicate uppercase mode selection.

Speech synthesis and speech recognition were added after the initial release, including support of natural-language queries with a relational database.

Promotion
TI was the first company to release videotape training videos for their computers.

References

External links
TI PPC  at Old-Computers.com : The Museum. Accessed 10 February 2015.

Professional Computer
Microcomputers